The Brig o' Doon, sometimes called the Auld Brig or Old Bridge of Doon, is a late medieval bridge in Ayrshire, Scotland,  and a Category A structure.

History
The word brig is Scots for "bridge", hence the Brig o' Doon is the "Bridge of Doon".

The bridge is thought to have been built in the early fifteenth century. According to John R. Hume, the bridge was built by James Kennedy, who died in 1465, but the first recorded mention was in 1512. The bridge was described as "ruinous" in 1593.

The bridge features on the 2007 and 2016 series of £5 notes issued by the Bank of Scotland, alongside the statue to Robert Burns, that is located in Dumfries.

Design

The bridge is located near Alloway and crosses the River Doon. It has been repaired many times, most recently in 1978, and many parts of the stonework do not match.

The B7024 public road is carried over the River Doon by the New Bridge of Doon, a single-arch stone bridge built downstream of the old one in 1816 to cope with increasing traffic. The old bridge was sold to the builders of the new bridge as a quarry for material, but money was raised to purchase the old bridge back, and the trustees of the new bridge decided to quarry somewhere else.

In literature

The line of the cobbles in the roadway is cranked, due to the belief that this pattern would stop witches from crossing.

It is used as the setting for the final verse of the Robert Burns's poem Tam o' Shanter. In this scene Tam is on horseback and is being chased by Nannie the witch. He is just able to escape her by crossing the bridge (over a running stream), narrowly avoiding her attack as she is only able to grab the horse's tail which comes away in her hands: 
"The carlin caught her by the rump
And left puir Meg wi' scarce a stump."

The Broadway musical Brigadoon also takes its name from this site, though the musical's location is fictional.

Gallery

See also
 Banknotes of Scotland (featured on design)

References

External links

Listed bridges in Scotland
Road bridges in Scotland
Category A listed buildings in South Ayrshire
Robert Burns